José Thurler (19 June 1913–23 April 1992) was a Brazilian Roman Catholic bishop.

Thurler was born in Brazil and was ordained to the priesthood in 1942. He served as bishop of the Roman Catholic Diocese of Chapecó, Brazil, from 1959 to 1962. Thurler then served as titular bishop of Capitolias from 1962 until his death in 1992. He served as coadjutor bishop of the Roman Catholic Diocese of Sorocaba, Brazil, from 1962 to 1965. Thuler served as auxiliary bishop of the Roman Catholic Archdiocese of São Paulo from 1966 until his death.

Notes

1913 births
1992 deaths
20th-century Roman Catholic bishops in Brazil
Roman Catholic bishops of Sorocaba
Roman Catholic bishops of São Paulo
Roman Catholic bishops of Chapecó